Dromtarriffe GAA is a Gaelic Athletic Association club based in the north-west of County Cork, Ireland. The club is affiliated to the Duhallow division of Cork GAA. Their hurling team currently competes in the Duhallow Junior A Hurling Championship and their football team currently competes in the Cork Intermediate A Football Championship.

The club has historically been concerned with the game of Gaelic football, but also fields teams in hurling competitions. Dromtarriffe (or Dromtarriff or Dromtariffe) is a small townland, as well as being the name of the parish in the same area. It is not a village, but the parish is centred on the very small village of Dromagh, which is around half a mile from the townland of Dromtarriffe.

Football
Dromtarriffe is one of the few clubs within Duhallow to have won the Cork Senior Football Championship. The club fields teams in the Duhallow Junior A Football Championship, and their successes have included a win in the Duhallow 2005 final against Ballydesmond. They then lost to Erin's Own in the 2005 Cork Junior Football Championship. Their latest successes include winning the Junior A county championship in 2018, defeating Kilmacabea 2-9 to 2-8. Two late goals from Darren O'Connor turned the tide after being down five points.
Dromtarriffe also have a Ladies' Gaelic football team in the club.

Hurling
Dromtarriffe also fields hurling teams, and competes at Junior A Hurling level. Dromtarriffe's minor hurlers made the Cork Minor C Hurling Championship final in 2009 but were defeated by Cobh. In 2016, Dromtarriffe's hurlers won the Cork Junior B Interdivisional Championship after a replay against Sarsfields GAA in Páirc Uí Rinn. A week later, the clubs under 21 hurlers won their first ever Duhallow Under 21 'A' Hurling Championship against Robert Emmets. They won the Duhallow Junior A championship for the first time ever in 2018 defeating Newmarket. They followed up their win in 2018 with a win against Kilbrin by 11 points with the game finishing 0-30 to 2-11.  They had success again in 2021 beating Millstreet 2-18 to 1-14 and made it to the county final but lost to a Ballygiblin side by 2-18 to 0-18 points.

Honours
 Cork Senior Football Championship (1): 1893
 Cork Intermediate Football Championship (1): 1935
 Cork Junior Football Championship (4): 1934, 1938, 1959, 2018
 Cork Minor Football Championship (0): (Runners-Up 1951)
Duhallow Hurling Cup (1): 2021
 Duhallow Junior A Football Championship (14): 1933, 1934, 1938, 1943, 1945, 1946, 1951, 1953, 1956, 1959, 1973, 1974, 1995, 2005
 Duhallow Junior A Hurling Championship (4): 2018, 2020, 2021, 2022
 Cork Junior B Hurling Championship (0): (Runners-Up 1985, 2014)
 Cork Under-21 C Football Championship (1): 2017.

Notable players
 Conor O'Callaghan
 Pat O'Callaghan
 Frank Corrigan (dual player)

References

Gaelic games clubs in County Cork
Gaelic football clubs in County Cork